Fatehganj Purvi (or Fatehganj East) is a town and a nagar panchayat in Bareilly district in the state of Uttar Pradesh, India. It is situated on the NH-30 and is served by Bilpur railway station.

Demographics
 India census, Fatehganj Purvi had a population of 7,706. Males constituted 54% of the population and females 46%. Fatehganj Purvi has an average literacy rate of 63%, lower than the national average of 74%: male literacy is 79%, and female literacy is 54%. In Fatehganj Purvi, 14% of the population is under 6 years of age.

References

Cities and towns in Bareilly district